Who's Cheating? is a 1924 American silent drama film directed by Joseph Levering and starring Ralph Kellard, Zena Keefe and Montagu Love.

Cast
 Dorothy Chappell as June Waugh
 Ralph Kellard as Larry Fields
 Zena Keefe as Myrtle Meers
 Montagu Love as Harrison Fields
 Marie Burke as Mrs. Fields
 William H. Tooker as John Rogers
 Frank Montgomery as Alexander Waugh
 Edward Roseman as Steve Bowman
 Marcia Harris as Mrs. Freeman

References

Bibliography
 Nash, Jay Robert. The Motion Picture Guide 1988 Annual. Cinebooks, 1997.

External links
 

1924 films
1924 drama films
1920s English-language films
American silent feature films
Silent American drama films
American black-and-white films
Films directed by Joseph Levering
1920s American films